The Angel Pool is the first studio album by the rock band The Autumns. It was released in 1997 on Risk Records.

Track listing
"The Garden Ends"
"Embracing Winter"
"Sunblush"
"Juniper Hill"
"Relinquished"
"Eskimo Swin"
"The Angel Pool"
"Nightswimming in the Deep End"
"Glass in Lullabies"

References

The Autumns albums
1997 debut albums